Decoy is a 1984 album by jazz musician Miles Davis, recorded in 1983.
Keyboardist Robert Irving III and guitarist John Scofield wrote or co-wrote most of the new compositions. The main theme of "That's What Happened" was lifted directly from Scofield's improvised solo on "Speak", a live performance included on the previous album Star People.  Saxophonist Branford Marsalis appears with the group on “Decoy”, “Code M.D.” and “That’s Right” playing soprano.

Background
Decoy is the first album Davis recorded without the help of longtime producer Teo Macero. Macero still had plans, including recording Davis with the London Philharmonic Orchestra, but Davis insisted on producing the album himself. Herbie Hancock's "Rockit" was a hit, and Davis figured he could get airplay with his own new album as well, if he added more synthesizers, as well as beefed-up bass lines and overdubs, and so "we put clothes on the melodies", he said later. Gil Evans advised him as well, and suggested, on "That's Right", that Davis put chords behind the trumpet lines as a contrast. The idea of layering sounds was put to practice on "Code M.D.", where Davis plays a muted solo behind his own solo.

Track listing
"Decoy" (Robert Irving III) - 8:33
"Robot 415" (Miles Davis, Robert Irving III) - 0:59
"Code M.D." (Robert Irving III) - 5:56
"Freaky Deaky" (Miles Davis) - 4:30
"What It Is" (Miles Davis, John Scofield) recorded live at the Festival International de Jazz, Montreal, 1983 - 4:32
"That's Right" (Miles Davis, John Scofield) - 11:11
"That's What Happened" (Miles Davis, John Scofield) recorded live at the Festival International de Jazz, Montreal, 1983 - 3:31

Personnel 
 Miles Davis – trumpet (1, 2, 3, 5, 6, 7), synthesizers (2, 4-7), arrangements (2, 5, 6, 7)
 Robert Irving III – synthesizers (1, 2, 3, 6), electric drum programming (1, 2, 3), arrangements (1, 2, 3), synth bass (2)
 John Scofield – guitars (1, 3, 5, 6, 7)
 Darryl "The Munch" Jones – electric bass (1, 3-7)
 Al Foster – drums (1, 3-7)
 Mino Cinelu – percussion
 Branford Marsalis – soprano saxophone (1, 3, 6)
 Bill Evans – soprano saxophone (5, 7)
 Gil Evans – arrangements (6)

Production 
 Dr. George Butler – executive producer 
 Miles Davis – producer 
 Robert Irving III – co-producer 
 Vincent Wilburn, Jr. – associate co-producer
 Ron Lorman – engineer, remixing
 Tom Swift – assistant engineer, editing 
 Guy Charbonneau – recording (5, 7)
 Mark "The King" Allison – technical assistant 
 Bob Ludwig – mastering at Masterdisk (New York, NY)
 Genevieve Stewart – administrative assistant 
 John Berg – package design 
 Gilles Larrain – cover photography 
 Blank & Blank – management

References

Miles Davis albums
1984 albums
Albums arranged by Gil Evans
Columbia Records albums
John Scofield albums